A fell is a mountain or upland area in northern England and other parts of Europe.

Fell may also refer to:

Animals
 Fell pony, a British pony breed
 Fell Terrier, a breed of dogs
 Rough Fell (sheep), a breed of sheep

Places
 Fell, Rhineland-Palatinate, a village in Germany
 Fell Exhibition Slate Mine, an exhibition mine in Germany
 Fell Township, Pennsylvania, a township in Pennsylvania
Campsie Fells, in Central Scotland, northeast of Glasgow
Cartmel Fell, a township in northern England
Coniston Fells, the mountain as a whole and its summit; the slopes have names such as Tilberthwaite High Fell, Low Fell, and Above Beck Fells
 Criffel, in Galloway, Scotland
 Fellgate Metro station,  on the Green line of the Tyne and Wear Metro network, serving the Fellgate and Hedworth residential areas of Jarrow, in South Tyneside, in North East England
Goat Fell, the highest point on the Isle of Arran, Scotland
 List of fells in the Lake District
 Long Fell, in Galloway, Scotland
 Middlesex Fells Reservation, also called Middlesex Fells, a rocky highland just north of Boston, Massachusetts
 Peel Fell, in the Kielder Forest on the border between the Scottish Borders and Northumberland County, England
 Scafell, a massif in Yewbarrow, Wasdale, Cumbria
 Seathwaite Fell, the common grazing land used by the farmers of Seathwaite, Allerdale
 Snaefell, Isle of Man
 The Fells, the historic John Hay Estate in Newbury, NH, USA
 The Outlying Fells of Lakeland
 Wild Boar Fell, in Mallerstang Dale, Cumbria

People with the name
 Fell (surname)

Arts, entertainment, and media

Literature
 Fell (novel), the name of the book that is a sequel to one of David Clement-Davies' books, The Sight
 A Pictorial Guide to the Lakeland Fells (2003),  a series of seven books by Alfred Wainwright, detailing 214 fells of the Lake District in northwest England (see List of Wainwrights)
 Complete Lakeland Fells (1994), a guidebook by Bill Birkett, that lists 541 fells (see List of Birketts)

Music
 Fell (album), a 1996 album by Andrew Hulme and Paul Schütze
 Fell (music), a music genre performed by Goan Catholic men and women

Other uses in arts, entertainment, and media
 Fell (comics), a comic book written by Warren Ellis and illustrated by Ben Templesmith, published by Image
 Winterfell,  the fictitious ancestral castle of House Stark, built over a natural hot spring, in A Song of Fire and Ice by George R. R. Martin, and Game of Thrones

Sports
Fell running, hill running and racing, off-road, over upland country where the gradient climbed is a significant component of the difficulty
Fellwalking, hillwalking

Trains
 Fell Diesel, the popular name for the British Rail 10100 locomotive (named after Lt. Col. L.F.R. Fell)
 Fell Locomotive Museum, Featherston, New Zealand
 Fell mountain railway system, a railway configuration using a raised centre rail (named after John Barraclough Fell)

Other uses
 Fell, a manufacturer of transmission gearboxes
 Fell farming
 Fellgate, marks the road from a human settlement (such as Seathwaite, Allerdale) onto a fell
Lord of the Fells, an ancient aristocratic title associated with the Lords of Bowland

See also
Fall (disambiguation)